Kevin Michael Burke (born December 7, 1946) is an American lawyer and politician from Massachusetts.

Early life
He was born in Somerville, Massachusetts and graduated from Beverly High School in 1964.

Education
He graduated from the University of Connecticut with a Bachelor of Arts degree in liberal sciences in 1968 and from Boston College Law School with a Juris Doctor in 1971.

Political career

He served in the Massachusetts House of Representatives representing the 4th Essex district from 1975 to 1979 as a Democrat and served as the District Attorney of Essex County, Massachusetts from 1979 to 2003. From 2007 to 2010 he served as the Massachusetts Secretary of Public Safety under Governor Deval Patrick.

Legal career
After leaving the Essex County District Attorney's Office he practiced law with Burke & Mawn Consultants and later Gadsby Hannah LLP.

In 2017 he was appointed by Massachusetts State Police Superintendent Colonel Kerry Gilpin to lead an investigation into the arrest of Alli Bibaud, the daughter of Dudley district court judge Timothy Bibaud.

On April 27, 2018, the Massachusetts State Police released its own report on the investigation and review of the scandal involving a redacted police report for the arrest of a judge's daughter and the discipline of two state troopers. Burke along with Nancy McGillivray, former United States Marshal for the District of Massachusetts concluded that former State Police Colonel Richard McKeon used "flawed judgment" in ordering the redaction of the arrest report.

Personal life
He lives with his wife Patricia in Beverly. The couple has three children.

References

1946 births
Democratic Party members of the Massachusetts House of Representatives
Massachusetts Secretaries of Public Safety
County district attorneys in Massachusetts
People from Beverly, Massachusetts
People from Somerville, Massachusetts
University of Connecticut alumni
Boston College Law School alumni
Living people
Beverly High School alumni